Kek batik is a type of Malaysian no-bake fridge cake dessert inspired by the tiffin, brought in the country by the British during the colonial era, and adapted with Malaysian ingredients. This cake is made by mixing broken Marie biscuits combined with a chocolate sauce or runny custard made with egg, butter/margarine, condensed milk, Milo and chocolate powders. The cake is served during special occasions like the Eid al-Fitr and Christmas.

History 
It is also similar  to hedgehog slice and the latest Prince William chocolate biscuit cake, although with some different ingredients. In Brunei, the Batik cake is covered by green colour topping.

See also 
 Biscuit cake
 Tinginys
 Chocolate biscuit pudding
 Hedgehog slice
 Kiksekage
 Kalte Schnauze

References 

Cakes
Chocolate desserts
Bruneian cuisine
Malaysian snack foods